The Helmore/GEC Turbinlite was a 2,700 million candela (2.7 Gcd) searchlight fitted in the nose of a number of British Douglas Havoc night fighters during the early part of the Second World War and around the time of The Blitz. The Havoc was guided to enemy aircraft by ground radar and its own radar. The searchlight would then be used to illuminate attacking enemy bombers for defending fighters accompanying the Havoc to shoot down. In practice the Turbinlite was not a success and the introduction of higher performance night fighters with their own radar meant they were withdrawn from service in early 1943.

Background
The then state-of-the-art metre-wavelength Airborne Interception radar, known in British parlance of the time as RDF (Radio Direction Finding) equipment, was bulky and, due to the operator workload, generally unsuited to carriage by single-engined fighters, and so required a twin-engine design. However, the early radar-equipped Bristol Blenheims lacked the necessary speed advantage over the German Heinkel 111s and Dornier Do 17 bombers then raiding the UK to be truly effective, the Blenheim being able to find the bomber, but often not being fast enough to be able to reach a position in which to shoot it down. Non-RDF-equipped single-engined fighters, whilst being fast enough to catch the bombers, simply could not find the bombers to shoot them down. In addition, there was some doubt as to the best way to find, intercept and shoot down attacking bombers at night. The idea put forward that an aircraft that carried a searchlight, as well as AI radar, could light up the attacking bombers after locating them for non-RDF-equipped fighters to shoot them down, the single-engine fighters having a considerable performance advantage over the German twin-engine bombers.

Development
At around this time the new Douglas Havoc then entering limited service as an "intruder" offered an alternative to the Blenheim, also having a considerable performance advantage, and it was decided to conduct experiments with these.

In September 1940, Sidney Cotton pursued the idea of an airborne searchlight for night-fighters, that he termed "aerial target illumination" (ATI). He enlisted the help of William Helmore, and they jointly took out patents on the techniques (GB574970 and GB575093). Helmore, a serving RAF officer, then sponsored the development of what became known as Turbinlite.

The searchlight was developed and built by GEC, and was fitted into the nose of the Havoc behind a flat transparent screen with power for the light coming from heavy lead-acid batteries fitted in the Havoc's bomb bay. Battery power for the 135 kW (1,200 Amp) searchlight was sufficient for about two minutes of operation. The Havoc's own armament was removed from the nose.

The radar fitted was the AI Mk.IV, with broad "arrow head" aerials protruding from the both sides of the aircraft nose with additional side-mounted, and upper- and lower-wing mounted, dipoles. The modifications were carried out at Burtonwood Aircraft Repair Depot and the resulting aircraft was known as the Havoc I Turbinlite.

The unarmed Havoc Turbinlite was intended to find the enemy bomber using its RDF equipment and then use the Turbinlite to illuminate the target for the accompanying Hurricanes to find and shoot down.

Service

Approximately 31 Havoc I Turbinlites were so modified, using the Havoc I or Havoc L.A.M. (long aerial mine), which had themselves originally been Boston II's, before the advent of the Havoc II Turbinlite, of which a further 39 were built, this time as conversions from the Havoc II.

The concept behind the Turbinlite-equipped Havoc was rendered obsolete with the introduction of centimetric radar along with suitable high-performance night fighters such as the Bristol Beaufighter and the later de Havilland Mosquito, although one of the latter, the Mosquito II, serial W4087, was itself experimentally fitted with a Turbinlite installation.

The tactic of using single-engined fighters unequipped with radar at night was later utilised with some success by Germany against RAF Bomber Command later in the war, the tactic being known to the Luftwaffe as Wilde Sau (wild boar).  However, the illumination provided by the much larger-scale fires created by the British allowed visual interceptions over the bomber's target by non-radar equipped fighters to be carried out from much longer ranges than had been possible in 1940.  This rendered the additional illumination that was intended to guide the fighters towards the bombers, and which was to have been supplied for the British by an aircraft such as the Havoc Turbinlite in 1940, superfluous.

Units
The following units are known to have used the Havoc I Turbinlite and Havoc II Turbinlite operationally:

In September 1942 the numbered flights were incorporated with their own fighter aircraft into new squadrons

Typically during operations, 1453 Flt operated in conjunction with No. 151 Squadron RAF and No. 486 Squadron RNZAF, illuminating targets for the fighters to attack, with each flight / squadron of Turbinlite Havocs being associated with fighter squadrons in their vicinity.

Other use
The Turbinlite was later considered in the search for a method of illuminating surfaced enemy U-boats at night, but lost out to the competing Leigh light.

See also
 List of aircraft of the Royal Air Force

Notes

References
Cotton, Sidney as told to Ralph Barker. 1969. Aviator Extraordinary: The Sidney Cotton Story. Chatto & Windus 
Green, William. 1975. Famous Bombers of the Second World War, 2nd Edition. MacDonald & Jane's 
Thompson, Scott. 2004. Douglas Havoc and Boston: The DB-7/ A-20 Series. Crowood Press  
"Research Enterprise" Flight via flightglobal.com, 30 June 1949, p. 775

External links

B25 MITCHELL OVER CHANNEL (1.17)
An illustration of a Havoc I (Turbinlite)
A similar illustration of a Havoc II (Turbinlite)
A forum with some pictures of Turbinlite Havocs

World War II aircraft of the United Kingdom
World War II military equipment of the United Kingdom
Searchlights
History of the Royal Air Force during World War II
1943 disestablishments in the United Kingdom